Daniel James Bentley (born 15 August 1984 in Chelmsford) is a Paralympic boccia player with cerebral palsy. At the 2008 Beijing Paralympics he was part of the first British team to win gold at boccia at the Paralympics, in the Team BC1-2 category. He competed again as part of the team for Great Britain at the 2012 London Paralympics, taking bronze in the Team BC1–2 event.

References 

1984 births
Living people
Paralympic boccia players of Great Britain
Boccia players at the 2008 Summer Paralympics
Boccia players at the 2012 Summer Paralympics
Paralympic gold medalists for Great Britain
Paralympic bronze medalists for Great Britain
Cerebral Palsy category Paralympic competitors
Sportspeople with cerebral palsy
Medalists at the 2008 Summer Paralympics
Medalists at the 2012 Summer Paralympics
Paralympic medalists in boccia